John Brasker Garris (born June 6, 1959) is an American former professional basketball player. He was a 6'8", 205 lb forward.

Garris played collegiately for Boston College and was selected by the National Basketball Association's Cleveland Cavaliers in the 3rd pick of the 2nd round of the 1983 NBA Draft.  He played in 33 regular season games for the Cavaliers in the 1983–84 season.

References

External links
Career stats at basketball-reference.com

1959 births
Living people
American expatriate basketball people in France
American expatriate basketball people in Spain
American men's basketball players
Basketball players from Connecticut
Bay State Bombardiers players
Boston College Eagles men's basketball players
CB Zaragoza players
Cleveland Cavaliers draft picks
Cleveland Cavaliers players
Liga ACB players
Maine Windjammers players
Michigan Wolverines men's basketball players
Power forwards (basketball)
Sportspeople from Bridgeport, Connecticut